The 2022–23 Women's Senior Inter Zonal T20 was the inaugural edition of the Women's Senior Inter Zonal T20, a domestic women's T20 competition in India. The tournament took place from 8 to 16 November 2022, with six zonal teams taking part. It was the first women's inter zonal competition to take place since the 2017–18 Senior Women's Cricket Inter Zonal Three Day Game. The tournament was won by Central Zone, who beat West Zone by 9 wickets in the final.

Competition format
Six teams competed in the tournament, representing regions of India. Each team played each other once in a round-robin format. The top two teams in the group progressed to the final. Matches were played using a Twenty20 format. All matches were played at the BRSABV Ekana Cricket Stadium, Lucknow.

The group worked on a points system with positions within the group being based on the total points. Points were awarded as follows:

Win: 4 points. 
Tie: 2 points. 
Loss: 0 points. 
No Result/Abandoned: 2 points.

If points in the final table were equal, teams were separated by most wins, then head-to-head record, then Net Run Rate.

Group stage

Points table

Source: BCCI

Fixtures

Final

Statistics

Most runs

Source: BCCI

Most wickets

Source: BCCI

References

Women's Senior Inter Zonal T20
2022 in Indian cricket